Liffré (Gallo: Lifrei) is a commune in the Ille-et-Vilaine department in Brittany in northwestern France. It is in the center of the region.

Politics and administration

Population
Inhabitants of Liffré are called Liffréens in French.

Twin towns 

Liffré is twinned with:
 Wendover, England
 Piéla, Burkina Faso
 Beniel, Spain

See also
Communes of the Ille-et-Vilaine department

References

External links

 Town website 
  Cultural Heritage 

Communes of Ille-et-Vilaine